Goricanites is a ceratitid ammonoid cephalopod known only from the Lower Triassic Union Wash formation of California (USA).  This fossil is included in the family Sibiritidae and subfamily Keyserlingitinae

References
Goricanites, Paleodb

Triassic ammonites
Ceratitida genera
Ceratitoidea